The Kulsi River is a tributary of the Brahmaputra River in the Indian state of Assam. The river originates from West Khasi Hills of Meghalaya.  The Kulsi river is known as Khir River in its origin. After travelling 12 km in Meghalaya, this river  then flows through Kamrup district of Assam  and is known as Kulsi. The confluence of the Kulsi river with Brahmaputra River is at Nagarbera of Kamrup district, Assam.

Habitat of Dolphin
The Kulsi river is the habitat of endangered South Asian river dolphin (Platanista gangetica).  This endangered dolphin (known as Xihu in Assamese language) breeds only in Subansiri River and  Kulsi River of the entire Brahmaputra delta. However, sand mining and other development activities make dolphins in the Kulsi river vulnerable and the abundance of this endangered dolphin has sharply declined.

References 

Rivers of Assam
Rivers of India